Hasan Nusret Fişek (21 November 1914 in Sivas, Ottoman Empire - 3 November 1990 in Ankara, Turkey) was a Turkish physician and Minister of Health.

Early years
Nusret Hasan Fişek was born in Sivas to Hayrullah Fişek, a commander at the Turkish War of Independence, and Mukaddes on November 21, 1914. He had a brother, A. Hicri Fişek. He was registered in Istanbul.

After finishing Kabataş High School in 1932, he studied Medicin at Istanbul University. In 1938, he graduated with honors. He began his specialization study in Bacteriology at the same university. In 1946, he became a specialist in Biomedicine and Food chemistry (Biochemistry). Fişek obtained a Doctor of Medicine title from Harvard University in 1952.

Nusret Fişek married Perihan Rukiye in 1940 (died 2007), who gave birth to two sons, Kurthan (1942-2012), and A. Gürhan (1951-2017).

Professional career
In 1955, Fişek became assistant professor for Biochemistry. He was promoted to full professor of Public Health in 1966. He gained international success for his scientific works on tetanus toxoid. He established biochemistry labs and contributed to their improvement.

In 1960, still head of the Public Health School, he was appointed undersecretary at the Ministry of Health, and served at this position until 1965. During this time period, he acted also as the minister's placeholder for a while. In 1963, Fişek took the post of the head of the  newly established Institute of Community Medicine at Hacettepe University in Ankara.

From 1983 on, Fişek served six years long as the chairman of the Union of Turkish Physicians.

He was member of many professional organizations at domestic and international level. He is the author of a number of scientific publications also in foreign languages.

Death
Nusret Hasan Fişek died in Ankara on November 3, 1990. He was laid to rest at the Cebeci Asri Cemetery in Ankara.

Honors
 150th Anniversary Award by Michigan University for his works on Demography,
 Fellow of the Royal College of Physicians (FRCP) for his works on Socialiaztion of Health.
 TUBİTAK Bilim ve Hizmet Ödülü (1993) by Scientific and Technological Research Council of Turkey for his works on Demography and Socialization of Health.

Legacy

Awards Named After Him
 The Chamber of Physicians in Istanbul established the "Prof. Dr. Nusret H. Fişek Public Health Service Promotion Award" in his honor. It is bestowed every year to persons or organizations, which contributed to basic public health service.
 Turkish Medical Association established the "Prof. Dr. Nusret H. Fişek Public Health Science and Service Awards" since 1991.

Places Named After Him

Schools
 A vocational high school in Ankara for health science
 A study center in Ankara

Avenues
 Adıyaman, Tut İlçesi, Reşadiye Mah. (since 1970, the only one not posthumous)
 Ankara, Sıhhiye
 Adana, Seyhan
 Tekirdağ, Çorlu, Muhittin Mah.

Streets
 İzmir, Alsancak
 Denizli, Saltak
 Eskişehir, Odunpazarı, Batıkent

Sağlık Ocakları
 Ankara, Çankaya, Yıldız
 İzmir, Balçova, Onur Mah.
 İzmir, Balçova, Evka-1
 Manisa, Salihli

Parks
 Ankara, Batıkent

Busts
 Ankara, Hacettepe University (on two halls)

References

1914 births
People from Sivas
Kabataş Erkek Lisesi alumni
Istanbul University Faculty of Medicine alumni
20th-century Turkish physicians
Harvard School of Public Health alumni
Academic staff of Istanbul University
Turkish civil servants
Turkish public health doctors
Academic staff of Hacettepe University
Health ministers of Turkey
1990 deaths
Burials at Cebeci Asri Cemetery